Gholamabad (also Romanized as Gholāmābād) is a village in Arudan Rural District, in the Central District of Mohr County, Fars Province, Iran. At the 2006 census, its population was 55, in 13 families.

References 

Populated places in Mohr County